Mamire is an administrative ward in the Babati District of the Manyara Region of Tanzania. According to the 2012 census, the ward has a total population of 9,814.

Mamire have one Teachers' College, one secondary school and six primary schools.

1: Mamire Teachers' College  http://mamiretc.ac.tz/

2: Mamire Secondary school

3: Mamire primary school

4: Endagile primary school 

5: Samta primary school

6: Endamaghai primary school

7: Mwikantsi primary school

8: Haidadonga primary school

References

Wards of Manyara Region